White Sands Space Harbor (WSSH) is a spaceport in New Mexico that was formerly used as a Space Shuttle runway, a test site for rocket research, and the primary training area used by NASA for Space Shuttle pilots practicing approaches and landings in the Shuttle Training Aircraft and T-38 Talon aircraft. With its runways, navigational aids, runway lighting, and control facilities, it also served as a backup Shuttle landing site. WSSH is a part of the White Sands Test Facility, and is located approximately 30 miles (50 kilometers) west of Alamogordo, New Mexico, within the boundaries of the White Sands Missile Range.

Runway facilities 
In 1976, NASA selected Northrup Strip as the site for shuttle pilot training. A second runway was added crossing the original north-south landing strip, and in 1979 both lakebed runways were lengthened to 35,000 ft (10,668 m), which includes 15,000 ft (4,572 m) usable runway with 10,000 ft (3048 m) extensions on either end, to allow White Sands Space Harbor to serve as shuttle backup landing facility.

Boeing's Starliner Calypso returned from a 49-hour Orbital Test Flight at 12:57 UTC on December 22, 2019 on runway 17/35. This marked only the second time an orbital vehicle has returned to Earth at White Sands.

Launch complex
The McDonnell Douglas DC-X of the USAF Single Stage Rocket Technology (SSRT) program was launched 1993-96 at the harbor.

References

External links
Historic American Engineering Record documentation, all filed under White Sands, Dona Ana County, NM:

Historic American Engineering Record in New Mexico
Launch complexes of the United States Space Force
Spaceports in the United States
White Sands Missile Range
1979 establishments in New Mexico
Space Shuttle Emergency Landing Sites